Prigarino is a rural locality (a settlement) in Romashkovksoye Rural Settlement, Pallasovsky District, Volgograd Oblast, Russia. The population was 140 as of 2010.

Geography 
The village is located on the Caspian Depression, in the left bank of the Yama River, 6.5 km from Romashki, 30 km from Pallasovka, 310 km from Volgograd.

References 

Rural localities in Pallasovsky District